Vassiliy Levit (born 24 February 1988) is a Kazakh heavyweight amateur boxer who won a silver medal at the 2016 Summer Olympics.

Career
In the 2016 Olympic final Levit was controversially defeated by Russia's Evgeny Tishchenko via a unanimous judge's decision. The crowd reacted with shock and anger to the result, and several boxing professionals criticised the decision, with some suggesting Levit should have been awarded all three rounds. At the medal ceremony, Levit put his fingers to his lips to discourage the crowd from booing Tischenko. Afterwards, Levit said that he felt that he had won the fight, but declined to criticise the judges and said that Tischenko deserved respect.

He won the bronze medal at the 2017 AIBA World Boxing Championships in the Heavyweight category.

Coaching career 
September 28, 2022 — appointed Head of the Department of Physical Training of Personnel Anti-Corruption Agencies of the Republic of Kazakhstan.

References

External links
 

1988 births
Living people
People from Kostanay Region
Kazakhstani male boxers
Olympic boxers of Kazakhstan
Boxers at the 2016 Summer Olympics
Kazakhstani people of Russian descent
Medalists at the 2016 Summer Olympics
Olympic medalists in boxing
Olympic silver medalists for Kazakhstan
AIBA World Boxing Championships medalists
Boxers at the 2010 Asian Games
Asian Games competitors for Kazakhstan
Heavyweight boxers
Boxers at the 2020 Summer Olympics